The Darvaza gas crater, also known as the Door to Hell or Gates of Hell, is a burning natural gas field collapsed into a cavern near Darvaza, Turkmenistan. How the crater formed and ignited remains unknown.

Geography

There are other craters nearby.

History
The early years of the crater's history are uncertain. Relevant records are either absent from the archives or classified or inaccessible. Some local geologists have claimed that the collapse into a crater happened in the 1960s; it was set on fire only in the 1980s to prevent emission of poisonous gases. Others assert that the site was drilled by Soviet engineers in 1971 as an oil-field but collapsed within days, forming the crater; the engineers chose to flare the crater to prevent emission of poisonous gases but underestimated the volume of the gas.

Controlling the burn 
In April 2010, President  Gurbanguly Berdimuhamedow recommended that measures be taken to limit the crater's influence on the development of other natural gas fields in the area. In January 2022, Berdimuhamedov announced plans to extinguish the crater in light of its negative effects on the environment and public health; a commission was established to find the optimum technique.

Tourism and Culture 

In post-Soviet Turkmenistan, the crater became a minor tourist attraction, perhaps, aided to an extent by the declaration of the region as a natural reserve in 2013. As of 2022, there is no road to access the crater and tourists had to depend on local guides. In 2018, the gas crater was used as an overnight stop in the Amul-Hazar automobile rally. In 2019, Berdimuhamedow appeared on state television doing doughnut stunts around the crater to disprove and correct rumours of his death.

George Kourounis 
In 2013, George Kourounis became the first person to set foot at the bottom of the crater; he was gathering soil samples for the Extreme Microbiome Project. The descent was featured in an episode of the National Geographic Channel series Die Trying; National Geographic had sponsored the expedition.

Kourounis used a custom-made Kevlar harness attached to multiple Technora ropes; he wore a full-body aluminized suit and used a self-contained breathing apparatus. He has since wished to descend into the crater again, carrying other equipments for a better profiling of the local biome.

See also

 Eternal fire at Baba Gurgur in Iraq
 Batagaika crater – expanding permafrost crater in Siberia
 Burning Mountain
 Centralia mine fire
 New Straitsville mine fire
 Well to Hell hoax
 Yanar Dag

References

Ahal Region
Energy in Turkmenistan
Natural gas fields in Turkmenistan
Persistent natural fires
Depressions (geology)
Natural gas fields in the Soviet Union
Environmental disasters in Asia